Monte Lema (1,621 m) is a mountain of the Lugano Prealps, located on the border between Switzerland and Italy. Its summit can easily reached by cable car from the village of Miglieglia (Ticino).

SOIUSA classification 
According to the SOIUSA (International Standardized Mountain Subdivision of the Alps) the mountain can be classified in the following way:
 main part = Western Alps
 major sector = North Western Alps
 section = Lugano Prealps
 subsection = Prealpi Varesine
 supergroup = Catena Tamaro-Gambarogno-Lema
 group = Gruppo del Tamaro
 subgroup = Gruppo del Lema
 code = I/B-11.II-A.1.c

See also
List of mountains of Switzerland accessible by public transport

Notes

External links

 Monte Lema cable car
 Monte Lema on Hikr

Mountains of the Alps
Mountains of Switzerland
Mountains of Ticino
Cable cars in Switzerland
One-thousanders of Italy
One-thousanders of Switzerland
Italy–Switzerland border
Lugano Prealps